Yagbum was the capital city of the Gonja (kingdom) founded by  Naba'a of the Ngbanya dynasty. Naba'a reigned from 1552/3 to 1582/3.

It is now northern Ghana, near the Black Volta and was founded by the Mande horsemen (c. 1600).

References

Populated places in Ghana